Linda Dano (born Linda Rae Wildermuth) is an American actress. She is well-known for her roles in daytime drama, in particular Rae Cummings on One Life to Live and Felicia Gallant on Another World. Dano was nominated for a Daytime Emmy Award five times, winning once in 1993 for her work on Another World. Dano also co-hosted the talk show Attitudes on Lifetime, and had a long-running clothing and home-furnishings line with QVC, first partnering with the home shopping channel in 1993 and ultimately working with them for over 20 years.

Personal life
Dano was born Linda Rae Wildermuth in Long Beach, California, to Evelyn (Delgado) and Ted Wildermuth. Dano was married to actor Frank Attardi for over 20 years until his death in 2004. She has two stepchildren, three stepgrandchildren, a niece, and a nephew.

Career
In the mid- to late 1970s, Dano appeared in such television police and detective dramas as Ironside, Police Woman, Harry O, Petrocelli, The Rockford Files (in three different roles), Starsky & Hutch, Charlie's Angels, and CHiPS, as well as in Emergency!, Barney Miller, and The Six Million Dollar Man (in two different roles). Dano was cast in the short-lived 1975 NBC comedy series The Montefuscos, which was cancelled after three episodes were broadcast and ultimately ran for seven. She had small roles in the movies The Last Survivors (1975), The Nurse Killer (1975), The Night That Panicked America (1975), and The Shadow of Chikara (1977).

Daytime series
After years of being on contract to 20th Century Fox alongside such actors as Tom Selleck, Dano joined the ABC soap opera One Life to Live in the role of Gretel Cummings from 1978 to 1980. From 1981 to 1982, she played Cynthia Haines on As the World Turns.

Dano next portrayed romance novelist Felicia Gallant on Another World from 1982 until the show's cancellation on June 25, 1999,  her performance winning her the Daytime Emmy Award for Lead Actress in 1993. She was also nominated for Leading Actress Emmys in 1994 and 1996, and for Supporting Actress in 1992.

On June 28, 1999, Dano returned to One Life to Live as Gretel, now calling herself "Rae" Cummings.  The character also appeared on the three other ABC soap operas at the time — All My Children, General Hospital, and Port Charles — in a crossover storyline, which was the first time a daytime character had ever appeared on four series. In 2003, Dano was nominated for a Daytime Emmy for Supporting Actress for the role, and left One Life to Live on March 13, 2004. In 2005, Dano appeared briefly as Lena Kendall on CBS's Guiding Light. Dano was impersonated on NBC's Saturday Night Live in the late 1980s by Nora Dunn. In early 2021, Dano stepped into the role briefly of Vivian Alamain on NBC's Days of Our Lives.

Other genres
Lifetime Television dedicated an episode of its Intimate Portrait celebrity biography series to Dano in 2000. From 1987 until 1992, she co-hosted the Lifetime talk show Attitudes and has both been a guest and guest-host on The View. Dano hosted an Another World reunion special on SOAPnet in 2003 for which she was later nominated for a Daytime Emmy for Outstanding Special Class Special. 

Dano has written a style and fashion column for Soap Opera Digest on and off for years, and has had her own merchandise lines on QVC, with Dano having celebrated her 20th anniversary affiliated with the home shopping network in February 2013. In 1999, she won the Accessories Council Excellence Award for outstanding contributions to consumer awareness.

During and since her run in daytime, Dano has guest-starred on television series such as Homicide: Life on the Street (1997), Desperate Housewives (2005), and What I Like About You (2006), as well as the 2007 film Reservation Road. In 2005, she appeared as the title character in Mame at the Bucks County Playhouse.

In 2021, Dano starred in a Hallmark movie production, A Little Daytime Drama.

Books

Romance novels
During her run on Another World, Dano co-wrote at least one romance novel published under the name of her character Felicia Gallant.
 Gallant, Felicia, with Rebecca Flanders (1984). Dreamweaver. Harlequin. . .
Donna Ball was a co-author.

Style guides
Dano, Linda, with Anne Kyle (1997). Looking Great: Fashion Authority and Television Star Linda Dano Shares Her Style and Beauty Secrets to Help You Look Your Best. G.P. Putnam's Sons. . .
Dano, Linda, with Anne Kyle (1998). Living Great: Style Expert and Television Star Linda Dano Shows You How to Bring Style Home With Her Easy, Affordable Decorating Ideas and Techniques. Putnam. . .

Causes

For several years, Dano has worked with organizations to tackle medical conditions such as depression and Alzheimer's disease. Her father's life was taken by the effects of Alzheimer's, and she battled depression later after the double loss of her husband and her mother, Evelyn, a week-and-a-half afterward, with her mother showing signs of dementia before her death. Dano is active in such groups as HeartShare, the National Osteoporosis Foundation, the National Alzheimer's Association, and Support Partners, among others. Dano is also a patron of the Catholic Guardian Society of New York.

HeartShare Human Services of New York bestows an annual "Linda Dano Award".

References

External links

 
 Exclusive Interview with Linda Dano
  (under her own name)
 Note. The U.S. library covers Taylor Brady as a real name, citing Contemporary Authors, rather than a pseudonym of Donna Ball, or Ball and Shannon Harper. It also treats all books published under the name Rebecca Flanders as possibly collaborations of Brady and Dano.

Living people
20th-century American actresses
American soap opera actresses
Daytime Emmy Award winners
Daytime Emmy Award for Outstanding Lead Actress in a Drama Series winners
American non-fiction writers
American romantic fiction writers
21st-century American women
Year of birth missing (living people)